Green Hill is a small unincorporated community in Medina Township, Warren County, in the U.S. state of Indiana.

History 

The town was platted on March 5, 1832 by William B. Bailey and his brother Horatio who named it Milford, for their home town of Milford, Delaware. The plat included 48 lots, two north/south streets (Main and East) and three east/west streets (Pine, Center and Warren).  The first store opened in 1833 and was followed in subsequent years by several more businesses, including a liquor store, blacksmith, grocery, tannery, shoe-maker, wagon-maker and others.  A post office was established on December 2, 1837 as Poolesville, in honor of the town's first resident physician, Dr. Poole — it retained the name until August 13, 1904.

In 1869 the citizens of the town voted to incorporate, and renamed it from Milford to Green Hill, owing to the town's Green Hill Seminary which the United Brethren established there. An 1883 history of the area cited Green Hill's population as "over two hundred".

In common with many other small Midwestern communities, Green Hill diminished during the 20th century as its rural population dwindled or moved to more urban areas.  Current population in undetermined, but satellite photography shows perhaps 30 homes in and around the town.

One of Green Hill's most notable natives is NASA astronaut Donald E. Williams, who served as pilot on the Space Shuttle Discovery (STS-51-D) in 1985 and as commander of the Atlantis (STS-34) in 1989.

Civil War general George Day Wagner was raised on a farm near Green Hill, and is buried in Armstrong Cemetery.

Geography 
It overlooks Little Pine Creek which flows along its north and west.

Demographics

References 

Unincorporated communities in Indiana
Unincorporated communities in Warren County, Indiana
Populated places established in 1832
1832 establishments in Indiana